Frederick Henry Deering (May 9, 1923 – March 15, 2010) was a former member of the Ohio House of Representatives.

Early life and education
A 1941 graduate of Monroeville High School (Ohio), Deering attended Ohio State University.

Career
Deering was nicknamed “Freeway Fred” because of his support to remove tolls from the Ohio Turnpike.  He was also a commissioner of the Erie MetroParks district, Erie County commissioner and a member of the Perkins board of education.

References

Democratic Party members of the Ohio House of Representatives
1923 births
2010 deaths
Ohio State University alumni
People from Monroeville, Ohio